The Brazil Rio de Janeiro 500 Years Open was the first of two golf tournaments that were held in 2000 to commemorate the discovery of Brazil by Pedro Álvares Cabral  in 1500. They were both included on the schedule of the European Tour, marking the tour's first visit to South America.

The tournament was held at Itanhangá Golf Club in Rio de Janeiro and won by England's Roger Chapman who triumphed in a sudden-death playoff over Ireland's Pádraig Harrington, who won the second tournament in São Paulo the following week.

Winners

See also
Brazil São Paulo 500 Years Open
Brazil Open

References

External links
Coverage on the European Tour's official site

Former European Tour events
Golf tournaments in Brazil
Defunct sports competitions in Brazil
2000 in golf
2000 in Brazilian sport